The Xiaomi Mi Smart Band 4 (Xiaomi Mi Band 4 in China) is a wearable activity tracker produced by Xiaomi Inc released in China on 16 June 2019, in Europe on 26 June 2019 and in India on 19 September 2019. It is 39.9% larger than its predecessor, has a super capacitive AMOLED display and features 24/7 heart rate monitoring.

Specifications 
Specifications:

 Display: 0.95 inch AMOLED, full color touch screen;
 Colour depth: 24bit;
 Screen brightness: Up to 400 nits;
 Resolution: 120 x 240;
 Button: Single touch button (wake up, go back);
 Connectivity: Bluetooth version 5.0 BLE; NFC on some models;
 Mass: 22.1 g;
 RAM: 512KB;
 Storage: 16MB:
 Battery: LiPo, 135mAh, 20 days of battery life;
 Sensors: accelerometer, gyroscope, PPG heart rate sensor, capacitive proximity sensor;
 Waterproof: up to 50 metres, 5 atmospheres

See also
 Xiaomi
 Xiaomi Mi Band
 Xiaomi Mi Band 2
 Xiaomi Mi Band 3
 Xiaomi Mi Smart Band 5

References 

Mi Smart Band 4 full specification

Sports equipment
Wearable computers
Activity trackers
Xiaomi
Products introduced in 2019
Smart bands